Amit Priyavadan Mehta (born 1971) is a United States district judge of the United States District Court for the District of Columbia and a Judge on the United States Foreign Intelligence Surveillance Court.

Biography
Amit Priyavadan Mehta was born in 1971 in Patan, Gujarat, India. 
Raised in Reisterstown, Maryland, Mehta graduated in 1989 from Franklin High School. He received a Bachelor of Arts degree in 1993 from Georgetown University, graduating Phi Beta Kappa. He received a Juris Doctor in 1997 from the University of Virginia School of Law, graduating Order of the Coif. He served as an associate at the law firm of Latham & Watkins from 1997 to 1998, leaving to clerk for Judge Susan P. Graber of the United States Court of Appeals for the Ninth Circuit from 1998 to 1999. He served as an associate at the law firm of Zuckerman Spaeder, LLP from 1999 to 2002, and then as a staff attorney at the Public Defender Service for the District of Columbia from 2002 to 2007. From 2007 to 2014 he rejoined Zuckerman Spaeder, serving as partner from 2010 to 2014. He represented clients in civil and criminal matters before state and federal courts.

Federal judicial service

On July 31, 2014, President Barack Obama nominated Mehta to serve as a United States District Judge of the United States District Court for the District of Columbia, to the seat vacated by Judge Ellen Segal Huvelle, who took senior status on June 3, 2014. He received a hearing before the United States Senate Committee on the Judiciary on September 17, 2014. On November 20, 2014 his nomination was reported out of committee by voice vote. On Saturday, December 13, 2014 Senate Majority Leader Harry Reid filed a motion to invoke cloture on the nomination. On December 16, 2014, Reid withdrew his cloture motion on Mehta's nomination, and the Senate proceeded to vote to confirm Mehta in a voice vote. He received his federal judicial commission on December 19, 2014. On June 1, 2021, Chief Justice John Roberts appointed Mehta to the United States Foreign Intelligence Surveillance Court.

In May 2019, Mehta ruled that accounting firm Mazars had to provide its records of Donald Trump's accounts from before his presidency to the House Oversight Committee in response to their subpoena. In a 41-page opinion, he asserted that Congress has the right to investigate potential illegal behavior by a president, including actions both before and after the president assumed office. The ruling will be appealed by Trump's personal legal team.

In July 2019, Mehta sided with the pharmaceutical firms Merck & Co., Eli Lilly & Co., and Amgen Inc. by blocking a Trump administration rule requiring drugmakers to put prices in television ads, a central part of the president's push to lower the cost of prescription medications. The goal of the rule was to increase transparency; Mehta ruled that requiring big pharmaceutical companies to disclose prices to consumers in television advertisements was something that could be done only by the Department of Health and Human Services if mandated by Congress.

As of 2022, Mehta is presiding over several cases related to the January 6 United States Capitol attack. He has charge of the criminal prosecution of Oath Keepers founder Stewart Rhodes for seditious conspiracy. He is also presiding over three civil lawsuits against former President Donald Trump and multiple associates, in which several congress members and two police officers are suing for damages for physical and emotional injuries they allegedly incurred during the attacks. On February 18, 2022, Mehta issued a lengthy opinion that rejected Trump's claim of "absolute immunity" from lawsuits, finding that his actions were not part of his presidential duties, and that there was plausible evidence to suggest he engaged in a conspiracy with organized groups to use any means, including violence, to overturn the results of the 2020 election. The opinion allows the case to proceed, with the plaintiffs demanding documents, depositions, and other evidence from Trump and members of the Oath Keepers and Proud Boys. Mehta dropped several other co-defendants from the suit, including Rudy Giuliani, Donald Trump Jr., and Representative Mo Brooks.

See also
List of Asian American jurists

References

External links

|-

1971 births
21st-century American judges
American jurists of Indian descent
Georgetown University alumni
Judges of the United States District Court for the District of Columbia
Judges of the United States Foreign Intelligence Surveillance Court
Lawyers from Washington, D.C.
Living people
People from Reistertown, Maryland
People from Patan district
Public defenders
United States district court judges appointed by Barack Obama
University of Virginia School of Law alumni
Virginia lawyers